Menchville High School is one of five high schools in Newport News, Virginia, United States. The school colors are purple and gold, and its mascot is a monarch.

Menchville is the top school in Newport News regarding the number of students taking AP exams and has the highest passing rate. In 2008, Menchville High School was rated as the 487th-best public high school in the nation, according to Newsweek magazine.

Demographics 

As of October 2009

Sports

VA state championships

 Boys' indoor track – 1972, 1973, 1980, 1982, 1983,1984, 1985, 1986, 1987, 2016, 2017, 2018
 Boys' outdoor track – 1972, 1979, 1980, 1981, 1994, 1995, 1996, 1997, 1998, 1999, 2000, 2001, 2002, 2003, 2004, 2005, 2006, 2007, 2008, 2009, 2010, 2011, 2012, 2013, 2014, 2015, 2016, 2017, 2018
 Wrestling – 1976
 Soccer - 2003
 Baseball – 2009
 Boys' swimming – 2016

Notable alumni
 Cocoa Brown – actress
 Paul Colton – entrepreneur, founder of Aptana and Live Software
 Jharel Cotton – MLB pitcher for the Oakland A's
 Quiana Grant – supermodel, appeared in the 2008 Sports Illustrated Swimsuit Issue
 Kwamie Lassiter – former NFL free safety, Arizona Cardinals, San Diego Chargers, St. Louis Rams
 David Macklin – NFL cornerback, Indianapolis Colts, Arizona Cardinals, Washington Redskins
 Al Toon – former NFL wide receiver, New York Jets

See also
 Newport News Public Schools

Notes

References
 Newport News School Board Office
 Newport News School Board: Menchville Report Card

External links
 Menchville High School
 Menchville HS Football

Public high schools in Virginia
High schools in Newport News, Virginia
Educational institutions established in 1970